George MacDonald Reid (1907 – 1969) was a Canadian sculptor who worked in London during the 1960s.

MacDonald Reid was born in Winnipeg, Manitoba in 1907. He developed a new approach to portrait sculpture using photography, a revolving dentist’s chair, and a machine he built himself that outlined the contours of the human face, for which he was awarded the US patent. This speeded up the early stages of the sculpting process, which he then rendered into an exact likeness using traditional artistic skills. He used electroforming to cut the price of bronze sculptures.

MacDonald Reid was stationed in Madagascar during World War II and got the idea for his automated method making sculptures from the techniques used to make contoured terrain maps. His basement studio was in Alford House, Park Street, just off Park Lane. Macdonald Reid's portrait busts included Prime Ministers Harold Wilson (UK), John Diefenbaker (Canada); and President Jomo Kenyatta of Kenya. Other busts included Gerald Nabarro MP, actor Jon Pertwee, racing driver Stirling Moss, Yama Saki, Madame Pandit, High Commissioner for India, and the Lord Mayor of London, Sir Edmund Stockdale. The Royal Automobile Association commissioned a portrait bust of the Duke of Edinburgh for their head office.

Macdonald Reid died in January 1969.

References

1907 births
1969 deaths
20th-century Canadian sculptors
Canadian male sculptors
20th-century Canadian male artists
Artists from Winnipeg
Canadian expatriates in the United Kingdom
Canadian expatriates in Madagascar
Canadian military personnel of World War II